Kildare Town Community School is a school in County Kildare, Ireland. It was formed in September 2011 following the amalgamation of St. Josephs Academy, Presentation Secondary School and Kildare Vocational School. The new school is under the patronage of the Diocese of Kildare and Leighlin, and Kildare Vocational Education Committee. The school was officially opened by the Taoiseach, Enda Kenny.

There are currently over 700 students attending the school.

References

External links
Kildare Town Community School website

Secondary schools in County Kildare
Community schools in the Republic of Ireland
2011 establishments in Ireland
Educational institutions established in 2011